Old Main  is a historic building on the campus of Pennsylvania Western University California (known before July 2022 as California University of Pennsylvania) in California, Pennsylvania.

It is designated as a historic public landmark by the Washington County History & Landmarks Foundation.

References

External links

[ National Register nomination form]

University and college buildings on the National Register of Historic Places in Pennsylvania
School buildings completed in 1868
Buildings and structures in Washington County, Pennsylvania
California University of Pennsylvania
University and college administration buildings in the United States
National Register of Historic Places in Washington County, Pennsylvania